Pasó en mi barrio is a 1951 Argentine film directed by Mario Soffici. It was entered into the 1952 Cannes Film Festival.

Cast
 Tita Merello
 Mario Fortuna
 Mirtha Torres
 Alberto de Mendoza
 Daniel Tedeschi
 Benito Cibrián
 Sergio Renán
 Paride Grandi
 Francisco Audenino
 Carlos Cotto
 Carmen Giménez
 Tito Grassi - El Negro
 Eduardo de Labar
 Hugo Lanzilotta
 Domingo Mania
 Luis Medina Castro - Carozo
 Fausto Padín - Taxista
 Juan Carlos Palma - Ricardo
 Alberto Quiles
 Hilda Rey
 Walter Reyna
 Manolita Serra
 Vicente Thomas

References

External links 

1951 films
1950s Spanish-language films
1951 drama films
Argentine black-and-white films
Films directed by Mario Soffici
Argentine drama films
1950s Argentine films